Mafinga is a constituency of the National Assembly of Zambia. It covers the town of Muyombe and the surrounding rural area in Muchinga Province.

The constituency was established in 1968 as Isoka East. In 2011 it was renamed Mafinga following the establishment of Mafinga District.

List of MPs

References

Constituencies of the National Assembly of Zambia
1968 establishments in Zambia
Constituencies established in 1968